Football Club Etar, or FC ETAR Veliko Turnovo, (Bulgarian: ФК ЕТЪР Велико Търново), was a Bulgarian professional association football club from Veliko Tarnovo. Founded on 24 April 1924, the club spent most of its history in the Bulgarian A PFG.

Their most successful period came under the management of Georgi Vasilev, between 1987 and 1992. Etar won the championship in 1990–91, which qualified the team for the 1991–92 European Cup, the first and only time Etar has played in the premier European competition. 

Following the success in 1991, Etar began a gradual decline in terms of performance, culminating in relegation from the top flight, as well as increasing financial problems. In 2003, the club was formally dissolved, due to inability to cover financial costs needed for professional football. Around the same time, a successor club, named Etar 1924, was founded to replace the old Etar. This new club saw little success and only managed to play one season in the A Group, after which it also folded.

Honours

Domestic 
Bulgarian A PFG
Champions: 1990–91
Third place: 1988–89, 1989–90
Bulgarian League Cup 	
Winners: 1995
The Cup of BFU
Winners: 1991

Contintental 
Balkans Cup:
Runners-up: 1992–93

History 
Football Club Etar was created on 24 April 1924, as a result of a merger between six clubs from Veliko Tarnovo. In 1930 they reached the Bulgarian State Football Championship semi-finals, losing 4–2 to Slavia Sofia.

European history

Etar's champions squad 
The squad for the 1990–91 season

External links 
 

Football clubs in Bulgaria
Association football clubs established in 1924
Association football clubs disestablished in 2003
Defunct football clubs in Bulgaria
1924 establishments in Bulgaria
2003 disestablishments in Bulgaria